Cyclone Zeus was an extratropical cyclone and European windstorm which affected France on 6–7 March 2017. The storm developed rapidly and moved quickly across France on a north-west/south-east trajectory from Finistère in Brittany to the Alpes-Maritimes then Corsica. The storm's rapid strengthening resulted in much stronger winds than initially expected, with a maximum gust of  recorded in Camaret-sur-Mer, Finistère.

The storm was the costliest storm of the 2016/17 winter across Europe.

References

External links

Valeurs de vent relevées le 6 mars 2017 (tempête Zeus) (In French)
Sting Jets and other processes leading to high wind gusts: wind-storms "Zeus" and "Joachim" compared.

Zeus
2017 in France